"Vuelo" (English: "Flight") is the third single from Ricky Martin's debut solo studio album Ricky Martin '91 (1991). It was released by Sony Music Mexico and CBS Discos on March 30, 1992 (see 1992 in music).

A music video was also released.

The song reached number eleven on the US Hot Latin Songs in the United States. It also reached number eight in Ecuador.

Formats and track listings
Mexican promotional 12" single
"Vuelo" – 3:59

Charts

References

1992 singles
1991 songs
Ricky Martin songs
Spanish-language songs
1990s ballads
Latin ballads
Sony Music Mexico singles
Sony Discos singles
CBS Discos singles